Baltimore is a village located in the southeast portion of Hamilton Township in Northumberland County in central Ontario. It is just north of the town of Cobourg, located at the intersection of County Road 45 (formerly Highway 45) and County Road 74 (Dale Road).

Baltimore was first occupied by the Irish immigrant John McCarty around 1805, and was named after his family's ancestral home in Baltimore, County Cork, Ireland. It is best known today for the presence of historic Ball's Mill, built in 1842, and as the birthplace of Letitia Youmans (1827).

External links
Maps and satellite photos

Communities in Northumberland County, Ontario
1805 establishments in Upper Canada